Quinnipiac University School of Law is located in North Haven, Connecticut. It is one of Quinnipiac University's graduate schools. Quinnipiac Law is the newest law school in Connecticut, having received full accreditation from the American Bar Association in 1992. It is a member of the Association of American Law Schools, and is currently ranked 129th by U.S. News & World Report.

According to Quinnipiac's 2017 ABA-required disclosures, 64 of the 84 graduates of the Class of 2017 obtained full-time, long-term employment in some capacity ten months after their graduation date.

Academics
The most recent 2021 released U.S. News & World Report law school rankings placed Quinnipiac lower than past years, at 129th. The 2008 ranking had shown a marked improvement, with the law school moving up eight spots to #108 from the previous year.

In 2009, the Princeton Review featured the school in its "Best 174 Law Schools".

The university offers three degree programs: The Juris Doctor (J.D.), the J.D./Master of Business Administration (MBA) double degree program, and the Master of Laws (LLM) in health law. Students may have concentrations in civil advocacy and dispute resolution, criminal law and advocacy, family law, health law, intellectual property, tax law, and workplace law. In Fall 2017, the school began offering a new concentration in international law and policy.

The law school has an enrollment of 390 students. Out of 917 applicants, 531 were accepted, and 142 were eventually enrolled as first-year students in 2019. The median incoming GPA for full-time students was 3.5, and the median incoming LSAT score for full-time students was 153. There are 31 full-time faculty members, and 69 non-full-time faculty members as of 2019. The student-to-faculty ratio is 10 to 1, and the average class size is around 25.

The school offers both externships and clinics to students after completion of their first year. Students may take these courses for experiential credits as required by the ABA. Externships are coordinated by the school, and are offered in areas such as corporate counsel, criminal justice, family and juvenile law, judicial, legal services, legislative, mediation, public interest, field placement II.

There are in-house clinical programs as well. Civil justice, tax, advanced (all areas), evening, defense appellate, and prosecution appellate clinics, are all offered at the law school. Other learning opportunities include summer study at Trinity College, Dublin in Dublin, Ireland and other opportunities to study abroad. Applications for the clinics, externships, and study abroad trips are required for each student and must be submitted by the posted deadline in order to receive consideration for the placement.

The 25th–75th percentile range of LSAT scores is 150-155 for the day division (full-time) program, and 152-156 for the evening division (part-time) program. Tuition for full-time students is $52,820. Tuition for part-time students is $1,845 per credit. Admitted applicants are also automatically considered for merit-based grants and scholarships during the admissions process. Traditionally, merit scholarships range from $10,000 to $40,000 per year, and may be renewed at 100% annually, if the student remains in the top 50 percent of his or her class. Other financial aid is available. The Deans Fellowship is typically awarded to 8-10 students per year and covers full tuition.

Bar Passage Rate: In 2017, Quinnipiac had a combined bar passage rate of 82% for first-time takers of the February and July Connecticut Bar Exams. The overall statewide passage rate was 72%. The Class of 2008 achieved a 96 percent first-time pass rate on the Connecticut bar exam, besting the statewide first-time pass rate of 88 percent. The Class of 2008 also fared well on bar exams in two additional states: New Jersey (100 percent) and Massachusetts (100 percent).

The dean of the law school is Jennifer Gerarda Brown. The school is fully accredited by the American Bar Association and is a member of the Association of American Law Schools.

The Raymond E. Baldwin Award for Public Service is an award given for public service in honor of Judge Raymond E. Baldwin.

There are approximately 4,800 alumni.

Employment 
According to Quinnipiac's official 2021 ABA-required disclosures, 56.4% of the Class of 2021 obtained full-time, long-term, JD-required employment nine months after graduation, excluding solo-practitioners. Quinnipiac's Law School Transparency under-employment score is 17.8%, indicating the percentage of the Class of 2021 unemployed, pursuing an additional degree, or working in a non-professional, short-term, or part-time job nine months after graduation.

Costs
The total cost of attendance (indicating the cost of tuition, fees, and living expenses) at Quinnipiac for the 2022-2023 academic year is $79,042. The Law School Transparency estimated debt-financed cost of attendance for three years is $259,610.

Facilities

The , two-level Law Library is recognized by the American Institute of Architects and the Library Administration and Management Association. The law library houses more than 425,000 volumes and offers wireless access throughout.

Located within the School of Law Center, the Grand Courtroom is designed as a place where students can conduct a mock trial before a judge and jury and make appellate arguments to a panel of judges. On several occasions it has hosted sessions of the Connecticut Supreme Court and Connecticut Appellate Court. It also serves as a spacious lecture hall for guest speakers who visit the School of Law.

Student competition teams
Quinnipiac University School of Law boast several student competition teams, including a Mock Trial Society, Moot Court Society, and Society for Dispute Resolution.

Mock Trial Society

The Mock Trial Society hosts two competitions each fall - an in-house intramural competition for students and an invitational competition against various schools. The society also attends numerous competitions throughout the year.  In the fall of 2015, the Mock Trial Society hosted its 15th Annual ABA sponsored Criminal Advocacy Competition. The Mock Trial Society has recently achieved great success in this competition by winning the last 3 out of 4 years - 2012, 2013, and 2015 - and placing as a finalist in 2014.

While each of the school's competition teams have enjoyed success over the years, the Mock Trial Society remains Quinnipiac's most decorated organization.

Society for Dispute Resolution

The Society for Dispute Resolution is the largest competition team at Quinnipiac, sending students to competitions in Negotiation, Mediation, Arbitration, and Client Counseling around the country. In 2019–2020, they hosted the American Bar Association's Client Counseling National Competition remotely during the onset of the COVID-19 pandemic, where their team ended up winning first place.

Publications
The following law reviews are published at Quinnipiac University School of Law:
 Quinnipiac Law Review 
 Quinnipiac Health Law Journal
 Quinnipiac Probate Law Journal (formerly the Connecticut Probate Law Journal, once the official reporter of probate decisions in the State of Connecticut)

Notable alumni
Gennaro Bizzarro, state senator
Ryan Cleckner, United States Army Ranger sniper with the 75th Ranger Regiment and author of the Long Range Shooting Handbook.
Joe Tacopina, noted defense attorney whose clients included Alex Rodriguez and Joran van der Sloot. Graduate of Bridgeport Law School (now Quinnipiac University School of Law).
Michael van der Veen, criminal and personal injury attorney. Representing Donald Trump during his second impeachment trial.
Felice Duffy, lawyer and public speaker. Former Yale Coach

References

External links
Official website

Law schools in Connecticut
Quinnipiac University
Educational institutions established in 1990
Universities and colleges in New Haven County, Connecticut
1990 establishments in Connecticut